Michael Patrick Higgins Jr. (January 20, 1920 – November 5, 2008) was an American actor who appeared in film and on stage, and was best known for his role in the original Broadway production of Equus.

Early life
Higgins was born in Brooklyn on January 20, 1920, the son of Mary Katherine (née McGowan) and Michael Peter Higgins, a poet and grocer who worked in the insurance business. He made efforts as a teenager to rid himself of his Brooklyn accent, hoping for a future career in theater. His father gave him an early a love of Shakespeare. He served in the United States Army in Italy during World War II, where he earned a Bronze Star Medal and a Purple Heart.

Career
After returning from military service, Higgins made his Broadway debut on February 18, 1946, in a production of Antigone (1946), starring Katharine Cornell and Sir Cedric Hardwicke in a modern-dress adaptation of the Sophocles play based on Jean Anouilh's French version. Higgins played the role of the Third Guard.

Higgins appeared in the original Broadway production of Peter Shaffer's Equus in the role of Frank Strang, the father of a youth who blinds horses, alongside Peter Firth as the youth, Frances Sternhagen as Alan's mother and Anthony Hopkins as his psychiatrist. As part of cast that Clive Barnes called "exemplary", Walter Kerr found Higgins "excellent as a father turned ashen when caught out at a skin flick".

Among his Broadway performances are Romeo and Juliet as Benvolio with Olivia de Havilland in 1951, Jean Anouilh's The Lark in 1955 with Julie Harris and Christopher Plummer, Eugene O'Neill's The Iceman Cometh with James Earl Jones at Circle in the Square Theatre in 1973, and the 1980 production of Mixed Couples, his final Broadway appearance. In 1963, he starred in Antony and Cleopatra opposite Colleen Dewhurst, in Joseph Papp's Shakespeare Festival in Central Park. He won two Obie Awards for his work Off Broadway; for his 1958 performance as John Proctor in The Crucible and in 1980 in David Mamet's play Reunion. He won a Drama Desk Award in 1978 for his role in Molly, earning honors as Outstanding Featured Actor in a Play.

He appeared in early live television productions including Kraft Television Theatre, Academy Theatre and Studio One, as well as on Ben Casey, Gunsmoke and The Andy Griffith Show. From 1949 to 1951, he played the role of Johnny Roberts on the NBC television series One Man's Family.

Later in his career he worked primarily on screen, appearing in over 50 films. He co-starred in Coppola's The Conversation and Barbara Loden's Wanda. He appeared in Angel Heart, The Black Stallion, The Seduction of Joe Tynan, The Stepford Wives, David Mamet's State and Main, and Charlie Kaufman's Synecdoche, New York, among many others.

Death
Higgins died at age 88 on November 5, 2008, at Beth Israel Medical Center of heart failure.

Selected filmography

Film
 
Shades of Gray (1948) - U.S. Army Soldier
Edge of Fury (1958) - Richard Barrie
Chūshingura: Hana no Maki, Yuki no Maki (1962) - Narrator (1963 US version) (voice)
Terror in the City (1964) - Carl
The Arrangement (1969) - Michael Anderson
Wanda (1970) - Norman Dennis
Desperate Characters (1971) - Francis Early
The Conversation (1974) - Paul
The Stepford Wives (1975) - Mr. Cornell
Death Play (1976) - Sam
An Enemy of the People (1978) - Billing
King of the Gypsies (1978) - Traffic Court Judge
The Seduction of Joe Tynan (1979) - Senator Pardew
The Black Stallion (1979) - Neville
Fort Apache, The Bronx (1981) - Heffernan
A Midsummer Night's Sex Comedy (1982) - Reynolds
Staying Alive (1983) - Dancer
Rumble Fish (1983) - Mr. Harrigan
Girls Just Want to Have Fun (1985) - Featured Dancer
1918 (1985) - Mr. Vaughn
Seven Minutes in Heaven (1985) - Senator Peterson
On Valentine's Day (1986) - Mr. Vaughn
Angel Heart (1987) - Dr. Albert Fowler
Courtship (1987) - Mr. Vaughn
Crusoe (1988) - Dr. Martin
New York Stories (1989) - Robber (segment "Life without Zoe")
Dead Bang (1989) - Reverend Gebhardt
Forced March (1989) - Andras Bereg
The Local Stigmatic (1990) - Drunk man
An Empty Bed (1990) - Man in 50's Restaurant
Death Becomes Her (1992) - Dancer
Wind (1992) - Artemus
School Ties (1992) - Mr. Gierasch
The Impostors (1998) - Older Man who Drops Dead
Just the Ticket (1999) - Confessional Priest
State and Main (2000) - Doc Wilson
Swimfan (2002) - Mr. Tillman
Messengers (2004) - Poor Old Man from Room 410
Off the Black (2006) - Al Cook
The Savages (2007) - Resident #1
The Favor (2007) - Mr. Ritter
Synecdoche, New York (2008) - Actor Playing Man with Nose Bleed
An American Carol (2008) - Parent

Television
One Man's Family (1949–1951) - Johnny Roberts
The Outer Limits "The Mice" (1963) - Dr. Thomas Kellander
Gunsmoke "Two of a Kind" (1963) - Irish Immigrant Finnegan
The Andy Griffith Show "Barney Hosts a Summit Meeting" (1968) - Mr. Clifford
Law & Order "In Memory of" (1991) - Thad Messimer "Ramparts" (1999) - Darryl Grady

References

External links

1920 births
2008 deaths
American male film actors
United States Army personnel of World War II
American male stage actors
People from Brooklyn
United States Army soldiers
20th-century American male actors
American expatriates in Italy

it:Michael Higgins